Thiognatha mameti is a moth in the family Gelechiidae. It was described by Viette in 1953. It is found on Mauritius.

References

Gelechiinae
Moths described in 1953
Taxa named by Pierre Viette